Grow Up or Sleep In (2005) is the first full-length release by Lawrence, Kansas band Ghosty. It was released August 30, 2005 on Future Farmer Records.

Track listing
 "Jacqueline" - 4:03
 "Big Surrender" - 4:24
 "Henry Greene" - 4:32
 "Rooms in the Dark" - 4:31
 "(In a Big World) Little Dreams Count" - 3:50
 "High on Life" - 5:26
 "Vandalism" - 3:14	  	  
 "Clouds Solve It" - 2:29	  	  
 "Go to Add/Drop City" - 2:48	  	  
 "World Travelers" - 4:03  	  
 "Hey! Somebody" - 5:02	  	  
 "Clouds Solve It (feat. Wayne Coyne)" - 2:33

External links
Ghosty official website

2005 debut albums
Ghosty albums